La donna di notte is a 1962 Italian film directed by Mino Loy.

Cast

External links
 

1965 films
Italian documentary films
1960s Italian-language films
1960s Italian films